Odiellus is a genus of harvestmen in the family Phalangiidae.

Species
 Odiellus aspersus (Karsch, 1881)
 Odiellus brevispina (Simon, 1879)
 Odiellus duriusculus (Simon, 1879)
 Odiellus granulatus (Canestrini, 1871)
 Odiellus lendlei (Sørensen, 1894)
 Odiellus meadii (O.Pickard-Cambridge, 1890)
 Odiellus nubivagus Crosby & Bishop, 1924
 Odiellus pictus (Wood, 1879)
 Odiellus poleneci Hadzi, 1973
 Odiellus remyi (Doleschall, 1852)
 Odiellus seoanei (Simon, 1879)
 Odiellus signatus (Roewer, 1957)
 Odiellus simplicipes (Simon, 1879)
 Odiellus spinosus (Bosc, 1792)
 Odiellus sublaevis Caporiacco, 1940
 Odiellus troguloides (Lucas, 1847)
 Odiellus zecariensis Mkheidze, 1952

References

Harvestmen
Harvestman genera